Baptiste Etcheverria (born 9 April 1997) is a French professional footballer who plays as a right-back for  club Nancy.

Career
Etcheverria was born in the Basque region of France, and spent his formative playing for various Basque teams in France and Spain. He signed his first professional contract with Tours FC on 23 July 2017. He made his professional debut with Tours in a 1–1 Ligue 2 tie with Nîmes Olympique on 10 February 2017.

On 17 June 2021, Etcheverria moved to Laval.

On 9 July 2022, Etcheverria signed with Nancy for two years with an option for a third year.

Honours 
Laval

 Championnat National: 2021–22

References

External links
 
 
 

1997 births
Living people
People from Labourd
Sportspeople from Pyrénées-Atlantiques
French footballers
French-Basque people
Real Unión footballers
Association football fullbacks
Championnat National players
Championnat National 2 players
Championnat National 3 players
Ligue 2 players
Tours FC players
Aviron Bayonnais FC players
SC Toulon players
Stade Lavallois players
AS Nancy Lorraine players
French expatriate footballers
Expatriate footballers in Spain
French expatriate sportspeople in Spain
Footballers from Nouvelle-Aquitaine